Thamizhachi is a 1995 Tamil-language drama film directed by S. Asokan. The film stars Napoleon and Ranjitha, with Revathi, Goundamani, Senthil, Vijayakumar, Mohan Natarajan and Srividya playing supporting roles. It was released on 29 June 1995, and failed at the box office.

Plot

The reporter Revathi comes to a village in search of interesting true stories. She later learns that a woman called Thamizhselvi has not left her house for seven years. When Revathi meets her, Thamizhselvi reveals her sad past.

In the past, Rasayya was a short-tempered man and the son of the village chief Periyasamy Gounder while Undrayar Gounder was a heartless rich villager. Both often clashed and fought. Some contrived situations made the villagers believed that the innocent Rasayya was a womaniser. Thereafter, Rasayya fell in love with Thamizhselvi who was from the nearby village and they eventually got married. Thamizhselvi first thought that Rasayya was also a womaniser, so Rasayya proved her the contrary. One day, Undrayar Gounder tried to rape Thamizhselvi but she killed him. Rasayya surrendered for the murder and he was sentenced to the capital punishment.

The reporter promises to save Rasayya from the capital punishment. What transpires later forms the crux of the story.

Cast

Napoleon as Rasayya
Ranjitha as Thamizhselvi
Revathi as Revathi (guest appearance)
Goundamani as Villangam
Senthil
Vijayakumar as Periyasamy Gounder
Mohan Natarajan as Undrayar Gounder
Srividya
K. K. Soundar as Thamizh's father
Suryakanth
Pandu
Kumarimuthu
Karuppu Subbiah
Vellai Subbaiah
Halwa Vasu as Jambulingam
Joker Thulasi
Kovai Senthil
Pasi Narayanan as Narayanan
Nalinikanth
Shanmugasundari
Kallapart Natarajan 
Gowtham Sundararajan
Ragasudha
Kavithasri
Raani
Divyasri

Soundtrack

The film score and the soundtrack were composed by the film director Deva. The soundtrack, released in 1995, features 6 tracks with lyrics written by Vairamuthu and 'Karur' Subramani.

References

1995 films
1990s Tamil-language films
Films scored by Deva (composer)